Michael Galea (born 1 February 1979 in Malta) is a retired Maltese footballer who started playing for Maltese First Division side Melita and enjoyed most of his career with Birkirkara where he played as a striker.

Playing career
Michael started his career with Melita and, in fact, he was a Melita product before being transferred to Birkirkara FC during the 1997–1998 season at a very young age of 18 years.

Galea is considered to be the best striker that the ‘Stripes’ ever had and, with constant loyalty to the Birkirkara FC shirt, he is the club's best scorer ever.

From his first day in the yellow and red shirt, Michael has shown his striker level, and despite being so young, he managed to score no less than 14 goals in his first 1997–1998 season.

In the debut of Birkirkara in the UEFA Competitions, Birkirkara was eliminated by the Slovakia's side, FC Spartak Trnava with a 5–1 score line and Birkirkara's only goal was scored by Michael Galea.

During season 1998–1999, which although was not the best when it comes to goals, Michael managed to score 9 goals, and he continued to impress and make it more difficult for every defense to stop him from scoring.

The next season was different as Michael was back in his form scoring 14 goals which contributed in no small way for the ‘Stripes’ to lift their first ever Premier League on the 50th anniversary of the club.

Season 2000-2001 found Michael, once again in his best form as he had managed a record number of goals with Birkirkara scoring 21 goals.

During the 2001–2002 season, Michael lived up to his class and scored another 15 goals meaning that after just five seasons with the ‘Stripes’, Michael had managed to score no less than 65 goals. In the same season, Michael won his first Rothmans Trophy with the ‘Stripes’.

Two seasons later, in 2005 came yet another victory in the Rothmans Trophy, as our team managed to beat the Finalists, Msida Saint-Joseph with Michael Galea's scoring of two important goals, which were enough to beat Msida with a 2–1 score line and for the ‘Stripes’ to win the 3rd Rothmans Trophy.

During season 2005–2006, Birkirkara managed to win another Premier League title, and the captain Michael Galea finished off the season as the club's best scorer with 18 goals in that season.

In a highly disappointing 2006–2007 season, Michael Galea suffered an injury which kept him away from playing for almost a year. During this year, the ‘Stripes’ managed only to qualify for the Intertoto Cup.

Season 2007-2008 was Michael's turn, and, although he only scored six goals in the league, Michael was the match-winner in the U*BET FA Trophy against Hamrun. He scored the two goals that Birkirkara needed to beat the ‘Spartans’ 2–1, which enabled Birkirkara to lift another Trophy.

2008-2009 was again not the best season for Michael, as he only scored 7 goals with Birkirkara, who had managed to qualify to the 1st round of the Europa League.

During the following season, Michael's experience was essential for the ‘Stripes’ squad as Birkirkara managed to win their 3rd Premier League title. Michael Galea finished the season as the 2nd best club scorer with 14 goals. Galea's contract expired at the end of the 2010–2011 season and he announced his retirement on 19 June.

International career

Malta
Galea has made five appearances for the senior Malta national football team, with his debut coming in a friendly against Andorra on 8 February 2000.

League career statistics

References

External links
 Michael Galea at MaltaFootball.com
 

Living people
1979 births
Maltese footballers
Melita F.C. players
Birkirkara F.C. players
Malta international footballers
Association football forwards